Puerto Rico competed in the 2015 Pan American Games in Toronto, Canada, from July 10 to 26, 2015. Unlike the 2011 Pan American games, Puerto Rico did not perform well, earning only 1 gold and silver each, and 13 bronze medals.

Artistic gymnast Luis Rivera was the flagbearer of the team during the opening ceremony.

Competitors
The following table lists Puerto Rico's delegation per sport and gender.

Medalists

Archery

Puerto Rico qualified one male archer based on its performance at the 2014 Pan American Championships. Later Puerto Rico qualified 1 more man based on its performance at the 2015 Copa Merengue.

Men

Athletics

Puerto Rico qualified 15 athletes (five men and ten women).

Key
Note–Ranks given for track events are for the entire round
Q = Qualified for the next round
q = Qualified for the next round as a fastest loser or, in field events, by position without achieving the qualifying target
NR = National record
GR = Games record
PB = Personal best
DNF = Did not finish
NM = No mark
N/A = Round not applicable for the event
Bye = Athlete not required to compete in round

Men
Track

Women
Track

Field

Combined events – Heptathlon

Baseball

Puerto Rico qualified a men's and women's baseball teams (the men's team consisted of 24 athletes, while the women's team had 18, for a total of 42 athletes). Puerto Rico has also qualified a women's team of 18 athletes, for a total of 42 entered competitors. Both teams ended up finishing their respective tournaments in fourth place, just of the podium.

Men's tournament

Roster

Group A

Semifinals

Bronze medal match

Women's tournament

Roster

Group A

Basketball

Puerto Rico qualified a men's and women's teams. Each team will consist of 12 athletes, for a total of 24.

Men's tournament

Group A

Fifth place match

Women's tournament

Group A

Fifth place match

Beach volleyball

Puerto Rico qualified a men's and women's pair for a total of four athletes.

Boxing

Puerto Rico qualified five boxers (three men and two women).

Bowling

Canoeing

Sprint
Puerto Rico qualified 2 athletes in the sprint discipline (2 in women's kayak).

Women

Qualification Legend: QF = Qualify to final; QS = Qualify to semifinal

Cycling

Puerto Rico qualified two male cyclists, one each in the road and track disciplines.

Road

Track
Omnium

Diving

Puerto Rico qualified three divers (one male and two women).

Equestrian

Puerto Rico qualified four equestrians across all three disciplines.

Dressage

Eventing

Jumping

Fencing

Puerto Rico qualified 3 male fencers. Originally the country also qualified men's sabre and women's foil teams, but for unknown reasons the country declined those quotas.

Golf

Puerto Rico qualified two golfers (one male and one female).

Gymnastics

Artistic
Puerto Rico qualified 7 gymnasts, only six competed (five men and one woman).

Men
Team & Individual Qualification

Qualification Legend: Q = Qualified to apparatus final

Individual Finals

Women
Individual Qualification

Qualification Legend: Q = Qualified to apparatus final

Individual Finals

Handball

Puerto Rico qualified a men's and women's teams. Each team will consist of 15 athletes, for a total of 30.

Men's tournament

Group B

Classification semifinals

Fifth place match

Women's tournament

Group A

Classification semifinals

Fifth place match

Judo

Puerto Rico qualified a team of five judokas (two men and three women). However, the nation only sent three judokas to compete.

Roller sports

Puerto Rico qualified one male roller skater.

Speed
Men

Sailing

Puerto Rico qualified 4 boats (6 sailors).

Shooting

Puerto Rico qualified nine shooters.

Men

Women

Softball

Puerto Rico qualified a women's squad of 15 athletes.

Women's tournament

Roster

Group A

Semifinals

Bronze medal match

Swimming

Puerto Rico qualified seven swimmers (four men and three women).

Women

Table tennis

Puerto Rico qualified a men's and women's team for a total of six athletes.

Men

Women

Taekwondo

Puerto Rico qualified a team of six athletes (three men and three women).

Tennis

Puerto Rico qualified one female tennis player.

Women

Triathlon

Volleyball

Puerto Rico qualified a men's and women's volleyball team, for a total of 24 athletes (12 men and 12 women).

Men's tournament

Quarterfinals

Semifinals

Bronze medal match

Women's tournament

|}

Quarterfinals

|}

Semifinals

|}

Water polo

Puerto Rico qualified a women's team. The team consists of 13 athletes. The men's team also qualified, but the country did not compete and was replaced by Ecuador for unknown reasons.

Women's tournament

Roster

Group B

Fifth to Eighth place playoffs

Fifth place match

Weightlifting

Puerto Rico qualified a team of 4 athletes (2 men and 2 women). However, only the two women ended up competing.

Women

Wrestling

See also
Puerto Rico at the 2016 Summer Olympics

References

Nations at the 2015 Pan American Games
P
2015